Harka Bahadur Thapa was the second chief of the National Investigation Department of Nepal and the Ambassador of Nepal to Bangladesh.

References

Year of birth missing
Nepalese police officers
Nepalese diplomats
Ambassadors of Nepal to Bangladesh
Possibly living people